Popůvky is a municipality and village in Brno-Country District in the South Moravian Region of the Czech Republic. It has about 1,600 inhabitants.

Transport
The D1 motorway goes through the centre of Popůvky.

References

Villages in Brno-Country District